Glady is a surname of North German origin. It is an anglicized variant of the original German language spelling Glöde (also spelled Gloede).

Origins and variants 
Glady (originally "Glöde") is a habitational name which is thought to have possibly originated in Glöthe near Calbe on the Saale river in the present-day German state of Saxony-Anhalt. It is also a metonymic occupational name for a blacksmith from the Middle Low German “glode,” or “glude,” meaning "iron," or "tongs." As a surname, the original variant is historically heavily concentrated in the northeastern region of the country in the present-day state of Mecklenburg-Vorpommern, and to an extent, the neighboring states of Schleswig-Holstein and Brandenburg. Because of this, it has also been proposed that the name might have originally emerged in the region of Pomerania in the 13th century,  which may be supported by its strong historical concentration in and around the region.

Today, while generally uncommon, the surname can be found throughout Germany, while the anglicized variants Glady and Gloede can be found primarily in the Great Lakes region of North America, particularly in the states of Michigan and New York, and the province of Ontario.

Until the gradual standardization of German spelling with the introduction of compulsory education in late 18th and early 19th centuries, many names displayed wide variations in spelling. In addition, as was quite common in earlier eras of mass migration, many immigrants either changed their surnames completely, or decided to use one of a number of various anglicized spellings of their original surnames, leading to wide variation in the spelling and pronunciation of what was originally the same name. As such, different variations of surnames such as Glady, from the original Glöde, usually have the same origin.

Notable people with the surname
Heikko Glöde (1961), retired German football manager and former player

References

Surnames
German-language surnames
North German surnames
Low German surnames
Germanic-language surnames
Surnames of German origin
Occupational surnames